Niccolò Boldrini (c.1500–c.1566) was an Italian engraver of the Renaissance. He was frequently confused with Nicola Vicentino. Boldrini was an engraver on wood, born at Vicenza in the early 16th century, and still living in 1566. His prints are chiefly after Titian, who may have been his master. He engraved John Baron de Schwarzenburg after Dürer and the following prints after Titian:

The Wise Men's Offering
St. Jerome praying in landscape
Six Saints including Catharine & Sebastian
Mountainous landscape with woman milking cow
Venus seated on a bank holding Cupid
Squirrel on a branch

References

External links
Pieter Bruegel the Elder: Drawings and Prints, a full text exhibition catalog from The Metropolitan Museum of Art, which includes material on Niccolo Boldrini (see index)

People from Vicenza
Italian engravers
Year of death unknown
Year of birth unknown
Year of birth uncertain
16th-century Italian people